Daniel Mattes (born 14 November 1972) is an Austrian internet entrepreneur and venture capitalist. He is the founder and was CEO of Artificial Intelligence company 42.cx and a judge and business angel on the Austrian television show '2 Minuten 2 Millionen', the Austrian version of Shark Tank, which airs on Puls4.

His 42.cx Center of Excellence for Artificial Intelligence focused on the commercialization of Artificial Intelligence ("AI"). The company was based in Vienna, Austria. It was incorporated in November 2015 and removed from the Austrian register of companies in 2022. 

Prior to 42.cx, in 2010, he founded Jumio, an online authentication company.

Prior to Jumio, in 2005, he founded VoIP company Jajah which was acquired 2009 for $207 million by Telefónica. In 2007, he was voted 81st most important Austrian citizen by Austrian magazine "News" in the "1000 most important Austrians" list.

On 2 April 2019 the United States Securities and Exchange Commission (SEC) charged Mattes with defrauding investors of Jumio Inc. Without admitting guilt, Mattes agreed to pay over $17 million to include a fine of $640,000. In addition, Mattes has agreed to be barred from holding any executive position in any company traded publicly in the United States of America.

Professional life

 In 1999, Mattes co-founded "Auftrag.at".
 In 2005, Mattes co-founded Jajah.
 In 2010, Mattes founded Jumio.
 In 2015, Mattes founded 42.cx Center of Excellence for Artificial Intelligence.

Publications
 2000 "Datenbanken mit Delphi" publisher: C&L-Verlag
 2001 "SQL – Der Einsatz im Intra- und Extranet" publisher: C&L-Verlag
 2002 "Datenbanken mit Delphi, 2. Auflage" publisher: C&L Verlag
 November 2002: Federal Award of Excellence, Austria
2019 "IP Assets: An Awakening in the Market?"

References

Austrian businesspeople
Living people
1972 births